Helen M. McKay  is Head of the Centre, Sustainable Forestry and Climate Change at Forest Research. In July 2020 she was appointed to the role of Chief Forester for Scotland by Scottish Forestry.

Research and career 
McKay joined Forest Research as a plant physiologist in 1988 where she worked to improve the physiological quality of planting stock. In 2000 she was made specialist advisor for forest operations and the physical environment. Today she serves as Head of the Centre, Sustainable Forestry and Climate Change. In 2016 McKay established the Forest Research Culture Working Group to improve forestry research culture.

McKay is a Fellow of the Institute of Chartered Foresters and serves as one of the editors of the journal Forestry: An International Journal of Forest Research. She serves as a trustee of the Scottish Forestry Trust. She was appointed Officer of the Order of the British Empire (OBE) in the 2020 New Year Honours for services to forest science and forestry.

Selected publications 
Her publications include:

References 

Living people
Year of birth missing (living people)
Plant physiologists
Officers of the Order of the British Empire